Beijing Rego British School (BRBS) was a British international school in Tianzhu County, Shunyi District, Beijing, China.

It first opened its doors in 2011 to students aged 3 to 18. The school had about 12 students in 2012, and 60 students by 2013. 

In December 2013 teachers went on strike as part of a pay dispute.

See also
 Shanghai Rego International School
 Tianjin Rego International School

References

External links
 Beijing Rego British School

Educational institutions established in 2011
Educational institutions disestablished in 2013
2011 establishments in China
2013 disestablishments in China
International schools in Beijing
Schools in Shunyi District
Rego Europe Foundation Schools